5Action (stylised as 5ACTION, formerly known as Paramount Network) is a British free-to-air television channel owned by Channel 5 Broadcasting Limited , a wholly-owned subsidiary of Paramount Global, which is grouped under Paramount Networks UK & Australia division. 5Action features a range of programming from the Channel 5 stable as well as other content from the UK and US, focusing on action, crime and wrestling.

History
5Action's programming and Freeview channel slot dates back to the days of Viacom's male-skewing channel Spike, which was launched on 15 April 2015 as a localised version of the American cable channel of the same name (now known in America as the movie channel Paramount Network). When Spike was launched it took the channel number (then channel 31) from Viacom's music and comedy channel Viva, but was operated under the auspices of Channel 5's programming director Ben Frow. It primarily aired entertainment programmes, including action and drama series, police documentaries, and programming from its U.S. counterpart, as well as mixed martial arts.

On 31 October 2017, the channel became 5Spike after Viacom decided the channel should be more closely associated with its sister channels and the Channel 5 brand. By now the channel slot had moved down one slot to number 32 due to a Freeview reshuffle, with the same kind of programming found on this channel number for the next five years. On 7 January 2020, the brand was discontinued in line with Viacom's global company policy, with the channel taking on the name of its sister channel, Paramount Network, and with no major change to its channel placement or programming.

On 19 January 2022, the channel was once again aligned to parent company Channel 5 when it got its second rebrand. It was rebranded again as 5Action, largely due to the Paramount name being used for the streaming service Paramount+ and as ViacomCBS had plans at the time to change the main American Paramount Network into a movie channel.  On 26 January 2022, 5Action was moved to a new Freeview number (channel 33) due to the relaunch of BBC Three on channel 23, meaning that all of the channels below had to be moved down one slot before the BBC channel started broadcasting again on 1 February 2022.

Programming

Current programming 
 Treadstone

Airport 24/7: Thailand
Car Crash TV
 Caught on Camera (episodes might be billed as Criminals: Caught on Camera or Seconds from Death: Caught on Camera)
 Entertainment News on 5
 Fights, Camera, Action
 Idiot TV
 Police Interceptors (some episodes known as Ultimate Police Interceptors)
 Police Raids: Caught by Surprise
 Traffic Cops
 Trucking Hell
 WWE Raw Highlights 
 WWE SmackDown Highlights

Former programming 

 Access
 Aftermath
 American Horror Story
 Arrow
 Channel Zero
 Designated Survivor
 Empire
 Gilmore Girls
 Grimm
 Heroes Reborn
 Home and Away
 House
 Impractical Jokers US
 LA to Vegas
 Lip Sync Battle US
 Life in Pieces
 Neighbours
 Six
 Sleepy Hollow
 Suits
 Teen Wolf
 The Mick
 The Office US
 The Strain
 Vikings
 When Calls the Heart
 Will & Grace
 Wynonna Earp
 The X-Files

Paramount Network

Viacom (ViacomCBS/Channel 5) operated two distinct versions of the free-to-air Paramount Network on Freeview (with the original pay-tv Paramount Channel becoming Comedy Central in 2009). The first version of the Freeview channel was launched on 4 July 2018 as a sister channel to 5Spike, and with a high-definition feed exclusively on Virgin Media from 21 July 2018. It ceased to be available via satellite in Ireland on 13 July 2018 having supposedly been made available by mistake, even though the channel had been promoted to Irish viewers before launch (however, the channel could still be accessed via manual tuning on Sky in Ireland).

On 7 January 2020, Paramount Network was merged with 5Spike in its slots on Freeview, Sky and Virgin Media, got its new branding, and subsumed its +1 timeshift channel on Sky. The timeshift channel ceased broadcasting on 14 July 2020.

Paramount Network rebranded as 5Action on 19 January 2022 in preparation for Paramount+ launching in the UK.

Programming
The original British version of Paramount Network was as a general entertainment channel showing American movies and series such as Suits and Lip Sync Battle. In 2020, Channel 5 merged this channel with that of 5Spike, with Paramount Network becoming more of a male-skewing channel, following the lead of the original American Spike TV, which targeted a young adult male audience, becoming Paramount Network in the United States.
This second version of Paramount Network had a schedule very much in keeping with that of 5Spike, with action movies at night, westerns at lunch and programmes such as Police Interceptors and Traffic Cops running episodes back-to-back early evening. When the channel got its second rebrand in early 2022, again no major changes were made to the schedule yet on Freeview channel 32 apart from the Jason Bourne spin-off Treadstone debuting on the channel.

Former programming (Paramount Network)

Original version

 Access
 Aftermath
 American Horror Story
 Arrow
 Cruise TV by LoveitBookit
 Channel Zero
 Designated Survivor
 Empire
 Gilmore Girls
 Grimm
 Heroes Reborn
 Home and Away
 House 
 Impractical Jokers US
 LA to Vegas
 Lip Sync Battle US
 Life in Pieces
 Neighbours
 Six
 Sleepy Hollow
 Suits
 Teen Wolf
 The Mick
 The Office US
 The Strain
 Vikings
 When Calls the Heart
 Will & Grace
 Wynonna Earp
 The X-Files

Second version (formally 5Spike)
Programmes broadcast on the male-skewing version included...

 Access
 Airwolf (now broadcast on ViacomCBS/AMC's Legend channel)
 The A-Team
 Can't Pay? We'll Take It Away
 Caught on Camera (episodes might be billed as Criminals: Caught on Camera or Seconds from Death: Caught on Camera)
 Gangland
 Fights, Camera, Action
 The Gadget Show
 Knight Rider
 Michael McIntyre's Big Show (this format was produced by Sky Vision, and was originally broadcast on BBC One)
 NXT UK Highlights
 Police Interceptors (some episodes known as Ultimate Police Interceptors)
 Police Raids: Caught by Surprise
 Raw Recruits: Squaddies at 16
 Sewermen
 Street Hawk
 Tsunami (with Dr Xand van Tulleken and Raksha Dave)
 Traffic Cops
 Trucking Hell
 WWE Raw Highlights 
 WWE SmackDown Highlights 
 The X-Files
 Yellowstone

References

External links
 at Channel5.com

2018 establishments in the United Kingdom
Channel 5 (British TV channel)
Television channels and stations established in 2018
Television channels in the United Kingdom